Haven Creek is a  long 2nd order tributary to the Haw River in Chatham County, North Carolina.  The name of Haven Creek comes from Haven Estate from which it flows.

Course
Haven Creek rises about 1 mile northeast of Pittsboro, North Carolina in Chatham County and then flows north and east to the Haw River about 1 mile southeast of Bynum, North Carolina.

Watershed
Haven Creek drains  of area, receives about 47.3 in/year of precipitation, and has a topographic wetness index of 399.92 and is about 64% forested.

See also
List of rivers of North Carolina

Additional maps

References

Rivers of North Carolina
Rivers of Chatham County, North Carolina